is a railway station in the city of Kōriyama, Fukushima Prefecture, Japan operated by East Japan Railway Company (JR East).

Lines

Station layout
The station has two opposed side platforms connected to the station building by a footbridge. The station is unattended.

Platforms

History
Hiwada Station opened on June 1, 1897. The station was absorbed into the JR East network upon the privatization of the Japanese National Railways (JNR) on April 1, 1987.

Surrounding area

See also
 List of Railway Stations in Japan

External links

  

Stations of East Japan Railway Company
Railway stations in Fukushima Prefecture
Tōhoku Main Line
Railway stations in Japan opened in 1897
Kōriyama